This is a list of women who have been particularly honored at the Veiled Prophet Ball in St. Louis, Missouri, as either belle or queen.

Origin

The custom of singling out a young woman for special attention began with the first Veiled Prophet Ball in 1878, when Suzanne (Susie) Slayback was chosen by the first Veiled Prophet, John G. Priest, to be the "belle" of the ball at the age of 16. According to a 1958 article in the St. Louis Globe-Democrat, in those earlier times it was "the custom of the Prophet to select a girl for his partner in the first dance at the ball."

The first crowned "queen" was Hester Bates Laughlin in 1894, whose coiffure was topped with a headpiece supposedly a replica of that worn by Queen Victoria.

 
The Veiled Prophet honorees have been:

Belles

1878–1893
 1878 Susie Slayback
 1885 Virginia Joy
 1886 Louise (Lulu) Scott
 1887 No honoree due to visit of President and Mrs. Grover Cleveland
 1888 Louise Galennie
 1889 Miss Wain (from Cleveland)
 1890 Katherine (Kate) Hill
 1891 July Thompson
 1892 Ellen Sturges
 1893 Florence Lucas

Queens

1894-1900
 1894 Hester Bates Laughlin 
 1895 Bessie Kingsland
 1896 Mary Louise McCreery
 1897 Jane Dorothy Fordyce
 1898 Marie Theresa Scanlan
 1899 Ellen H. Walsh
 1900 Susan Larkin Thomson

1901–1950
 1901 Emily Catlin Wickham
 1902 Maud Wells
 1903 Lucille Chouteau
 1904 Stella Wade
 1905 Julia Cabanne
 1906 Marguerite Kehlor Tower
 1907 Margaret Cabell
 1908 Dorothy Shapleigh
 1909 Susan Rebecca Carleton
 1910 Lucy Norvell
 1911 Ada Randolph
 1912 Jane Taylor
 1913 Adaline Capen
 1914 Elsa Zeibig 
 1915 Jane Shapleigh
 1916 Mary D. Jones
 1917–1918 (No ball because of World War I)
 1919 Marian Franciscus
 1920 Ada Johnson
 1921 Eleanor Simmons
 1922 Alice Busch
 1923 Grace Wallace
 1924 Mary Virginia Collins
 1925 Maud Miller Streett
 1926 Martha Irene Love
 1927 Anne Semple
 1928 Mary Ambrose Smith (disqualified due to secret marriage)
 1929 Jean Ford
 1930 Jane Francis
 1931 Ann Ferriss
 1932 Myrtle Lambert
 1933 Jane Johnson
 1934 Jane Wells
 1935 Lila Childress
 1936 Susan Thompson
 1937 Nancy Morrill
 1938 Laura Rand
 1939 Jane Smith
 1940 Rosalie McRee
 1941 Barbara Wear
 1942–1945 (No ball because of World War II)
 1946 Anne Kennett Desloge
 1947 Dorothy Danforth
 1948 Helen Conant
 1949 Carol Gardner
 1950 Eleanor Koehler

1951–2000

 1951 Mary Kennard Wallace
 1952 Sally Shepley
 1953 Julia Terry
 1954 Barbara Whittemore
 1955 Audrey Wallace
 1956 Helene Bakewell
 1957 Carol Culver
 1958 Carolyn Niedringhaus
 1959 Laura Rand Orthwein
 1960 Sally Ford Curby
 1961 Anne Marie Baldwin
 1962 Diane Waring Desloge
 1963 Anne Kennard Newhard
 1964 Alice Busch Condie
 1965 Becky Wells Jones
 1966 Jane Howard Shapleigh
 1967 Rosalie McRee Ewing
 1968 Rebecca Dixon Williams
 1969 Josephine Carr Brodhead
 1970 Phoebe Mercer Scott
 1971 Lenita Collins Morrill
 1972 Hope Florence Jones
 1973 Susan Mitchell Conant
 1974 Susan Clark Smith
 1975 Sarah Hitchcock Moore
 1976 Cynthia Gray Danforth
 1977 Gertrude Marie Busch
 1978 Elizabeth Courtney Johnson
 1979 Susan Pierson Smith
 1980 Eleanor Church Hawes
 1981 Talbot Peters MacCarthy
 1982 Alice Margaret Maritz
 1983 Elizabeth Ford Johnston
 1984 Mary Genevieve Hyland
 1985 Jennifer Lee Knight
 1986 Stephanie Marie Schnuck
 1987 Emily Shepley Barksdale
 1988 Elizabeth Gray Elliott
 1989 Alice Marie Behan
 1990 Carter Gedge Walker
 1991 Katherine Hall McDonnell
 1992 Kelly Crawford Taylor
 1993 McKay Noland Baur
 1994 Margaret "Molly" Dunne Hager
 1995 Martha Elizabeth "Marka" Matthews
 1996 Elizabeth Ann Bryan
 1997 Rosalie "Lele" Ewing Engler
 1998 Josephine Marie Condie
 1999 Elizabeth Claire Kemper
 2000 Carolyn Elizabeth Schnuck

2001 and after
 2001 Julia Ryerson Schlafly
 2002 Lucy Hager Schnuck
 2003 Lauren Morgan Dorsey Thomas
 2004 Elizabeth Garrett Benoist
 2005 Julie Anne Stupp
 2006 Janice Hope Jones
 2007 Katherine Remington Martin
 2008 Elizabeth Bunn Hailand
 2009 Melissa Benton Howe
 2010 Laura Hogan Hollo
 2011 Eleanor Clark Brennan
 2012 Margaret Frances Schnuck
 2013 Katherine Falk Desloge
 2014 Merrill Clark Hermann
 2015 Charlotte Capen Jones
 2016 Eliza Dooley Johnson
 2017 Corinne Marie Condie
 2018 Cecelia Ann Fox
 2019 Lily Shelton Baur

See also

 List of Veiled Prophet Parade themes

References

Further reading

  Marguerite Martyn, "The Veiled Prophet's Early Visits to His City," St. Louis Post-Dispatch, October 7, 1931, image 30 ("A Former Queen of Love and Beauty Returns to the Scene of Her Triumph and Recalls the Origin of Many of the Pageant's Customs.")
   "Veiled Prophet Ball: Former Queens and Ladies of Honor," Ladue News, with illustrations of then-recent honorees

History of St. Louis